Marakabei is a town in central Lesotho. It is located southeast of the capital Maseru, close to the banks of the Senqunyane River, between the God Help Me Pass and Mokhoabong Pass.

References
Fitzpatrick, M., Blond, B., Pitcher, G., Richmond, S., and Warren, M. (2004) South Africa, Lesotho and Swaziland. Footscray, VIC: Lonely Planet.

Populated places in Thaba-Tseka District